Powerslave is the fifth studio album by the English heavy metal band Iron Maiden, released on 3 September 1984 through EMI Records in Europe and its sister label Capitol Records in North America. It was re-released by Sanctuary and Columbia Records in the United States in 2002.

The album's cover artwork is notable for its Ancient Egypt theme. That theme, taken from the title track, was carried over to the album's supporting tour, the World Slavery Tour. This began in Warsaw, Poland, on 9 August 1984; it is widely regarded as being the band's longest and most arduous tour to date, and led to the live album Live After Death.

The release contains a musical re-telling of Samuel Taylor Coleridge's The Rime of the Ancient Mariner, the lyrics of which include some lines from the poem. At 13 minutes and 45 seconds in length, this was Iron Maiden's longest song for over 30 years until it was surpassed by the 18-minute "Empire of the Clouds" from the 2015 album The Book of Souls.

Powerslave is notable as the band's first album to feature the same personnel as their previous studio release. This lineup would remain intact for two further studio releases. It is also their last album to date to feature an instrumental piece, and the only one until Senjutsu (2021) in which longtime member and guitarist Dave Murray does not have a songwriting credit.

"2 Minutes to Midnight" and "Aces High" were released as singles.

Background, writing and recording
Following the conclusion of their highly successful World Piece Tour in December 1983, during which Iron Maiden headlined large venues and arenas in the US for the first time in their career, the band took three weeks off in January 1984, before regrouping at Le Chalet Hotel in Jersey where they rehearsed for six weeks. As with Powerslaves predecessor Piece of Mind (1983), this was where most of the album's writing took place; the band then began recording it at Compass Point Studios in Nassau, Bahamas.

Bassist Steve Harris recalled how, under time pressure, the song "Rime of the Ancient Mariner" was written in a relatively short space of time. Influenced by Samuel Taylor Coleridge's poem of the same name (drawing heavily from his 1815–16 gloss), the song directly quotes two passages from the poem, the former including the famous lines: 'Water, water everywhere – nor any drop to drink'. At over thirteen minutes long, the track contains several distinct sections with differing moods and would become a fan favourite. During the 2008–09 Somewhere Back in Time World Tour, guitarist Dave Murray, vocalist Bruce Dickinson and Harris cited the song as their favourite to play live.

Once finished, the band undertook another short break while the album was mixed at Electric Lady Studios, New York, before reconvening in Fort Lauderdale, Florida to rehearse for the World Slavery Tour. The tour began in Poland in August 1984 and ended in California in July 1985. The stage set echoed the album cover, including monumental pedestals several stories high, atop which the musicians appeared at times during the show. The set amply filled even the gigantic proscenium of Radio City Music Hall. The tour was the first time a heavy metal band had taken a full set behind the Iron Curtain, visiting Poland and Hungary, a landmark achievement at the time. It continued into South America – the first time the band had toured there – where they played to an estimated audience of 350,000 at the inaugural Rock in Rio as special guests of the band Queen. The Live After Death album and video, recorded over four nights at Long Beach Arena in LA and Hammersmith Odeon in London, were also released; these respectively peaked at No. 2 and No. 1 in the UK charts.

In total, the tour was eleven months long and touched 28 countries. Powerslave debuted at No. 2 in the UK Albums Chart, as a result of their record company EMI's third Now That's What I Call Music! pop compilation. According to both Nicko McBrain and Adrian Smith, Powerslave began making Iron Maiden famous "very fast, very quickly", such as in Brazil, where hundreds of fans waited outside hotels and restaurants for the band.

Reception

"Powerslave" was ranked at number 38 on Rolling Stones list of "100 Greatest Metal Albums of All Time" in 2017.

In other media

The song "Flash of the Blade" was included on the soundtrack of Dario Argento's 1985 horror film Phenomena, and was covered by the American band Avenged Sevenfold on their double live album/DVD Live in the LBC & Diamonds in the Rough (and was later featured on their greatest hits album). Rhapsody of Fire have also recorded a cover of the song that is featured on the deluxe edition of their album From Chaos to Eternity.

Track listing

 It was re-released in 1998 with an extra multimedia section, which featured the music videos for "Aces High" and "2 Minutes to Midnight".
 In this same version, the intro of "Powerslave" was moved to the end of "Back in the Village".
 "King of Twilight" incorporates elements of "Crying in the Dark", another song by the same band, taken from their 1972 album A Tab in the Ocean.

Personnel
Production and performance credits are adapted from the album liner notes.

Iron Maiden
Bruce Dickinson – vocals
Dave Murray – guitars
Adrian Smith – guitars
Steve Harris – bass
Nicko McBrain – drums

Additional personnel
Martin "Pool Bully" Birch – producer, engineer, mixing
Frank Gibson – assistant engineer
Bruce Buchhalter – assistant engineer
George Marino – mastering
Derek Riggs – sleeve design, sleeve concept, sleeve illustration
Moshe Brakha – photography
Rod Smallwood – management, sleeve design, sleeve concept
Andy Taylor – management
Simon Heyworth – remastering (1998 edition)
Ross Halfin – photography (1998 edition)

Additional notes
Catalogue
(1984 LP) EMI POWER 1/EJ 2402001 [UK]
(1984 LP) Capitol ST-12321 [USA]
(1984 CD) EMI/Capitol CDP 7 46045 2 [Worldwide]
(1998 CD) EMI 7243 4 96920 0 8 [UK]
(1998 CD) Sanctuary/Metal Is/Columbia CK-86212 [USA]
(2002 CD) Sanctuary CK-86044 [Album Replica] [USA]

Charts

Weekly charts

Certifications

Notes

References

1984 albums
Iron Maiden albums
Albums produced by Martin Birch
EMI Records albums
Albums recorded at Electric Lady Studios